John Richard Webb (September 9, 1915 – June 10, 1993) was an American film, television and radio actor.

He appeared in more than fifty films, including many westerns and films noir including Out of the Past (1947), Night Has a Thousand Eyes (1948), I Was a Communist for the FBI (1951) and Carson City (1952). Today, he may be best remembered as the star of the 1950s television series, Captain Midnight (Jet Jackson, Flying Commando in syndication), based on a long-running radio program of the same name and Border Patrol.

Early years
Originally from Bloomington, Illinois, Webb was the son of John Renner Webb and Laura Gail Gunnett.

Leaving Brown University theological school in 1936 when he realized he was not meant to be a Methodist minister, Webb enlisted in the United States Army and was stationed with the 1st Coast Artillery Regiment in Panama for three years when he decided to go to Hollywood attending the Bliss Hayden School of Acting.

Career

1940s
Webb was discovered by Paramount Pictures in 1940 where he was soon engaged as a contract player appearing in such films as I Wanted Wings, Sullivan's Travels and This Gun for Hire .  During World War II he reenlisted at Fort Ord in 1942, then was commissioned in the US Army at Fort Benning ending the war as a captain; he remained in the Army Reserve rising to the rank of Major. Four months after leaving the Army he was back at Paramount in O.S.S.. After leaving Paramount Webb was originally offered a leading role in Sands of Iwo Jima.  After receiving his salary and costume he was told that "powers that be" wished John Agar in the role and asked him if he would like another part in the film, that Webb accepted.

1950s

In 1951, Webb was contracted to Warner Bros where he played in I Was a Communist for the FBI then appeared along with Gary Cooper in the "Florida Western" Distant Drums. In 1957, Webb played Ben Maxwell in the episode "The Long Hunt" of the TV series Maverick. In 1958, Webb appeared in the episode "Wheel of Fortune" of the NBC western series, Jefferson Drum. Webb in 1958 played the role of Rocky Norton in the episode "Dead Reckoning" of the ABC/Warner Bros. western series, Colt .45.

1960s
In 1960, Webb shot an unsuccessful television pilot for a spy series with Mark Damon, called Calling CQ.

In the same year he was cast as Clay in the episode "Calico" of another ABC/WB western series, The Alaskans then played imposter Henry Walker on CBS's Rawhide in the episode "Incident of the Stargazer". He was also cast in an episode of the 1960 CBS sitcom, My Sister Eileen.

In still another 1960 role, Webb was cast as Thomas Francis Meagher in the 1960 episode "The General Who Disappeared" on the syndicated television anthology series, Death Valley Days. In a 1963 appearance, Webb was cast as Caleb in the Death Valley Days episode, "The Peacemaker".

In 1963, Webb also portrayed George C. Belter, the murdered owner of Spicy Bits, a gossip magazine, in the Perry Mason episode, "The Case of the Velvet Claws. In 1965, Webb again played the murder victim on Perry Mason, this time as Addison Powell in "The Case of the Impetuous Imp."

In 1966 Webb played greedy Furrier “Aaron Tigue” in S11E29's “The Treasure of John Walking Fox” on Gunsmoke. Webb played Lieutenant Commander Ben Finney in an episode of Star Trek: The Original Series ("Court Martial", 1967). In the 1970s, Webb became a writer and published four books on psychic phenomena.

Writing 
Webb wrote four books, Great Ghosts of the West, Voices From Another World and These Came Back, about psychic phenomena and the occult, and The Laughs on Hollywood, a collection of anecdotes about the entertainment industry.

Death
Hindered by a long-term respiratory illness, Webb died of a self-inflicted gunshot on June 10, 1993, in Van Nuys, California.

Selected filmography

 Rancho Grande (1940) - Steve - Ranch Guest (uncredited)
 I Wanted Wings (1941) - Cadet Captain
 West Point Widow (1941) - Intern (uncredited)
 Hold Back the Dawn (1941) - Movie Actor in Role of Jeff (uncredited)
 Sullivan's Travels (1941) - Radio Man
 Among the Living (1941) - Hotel Clerk (uncredited)
 Pacific Blackout (1941) - Interne (uncredited)
 The Lady Has Plans (1942) - Pan Am Information Clerk (uncredited)
 The Remarkable Andrew (1942) - Randall Stevens
 This Gun for Hire (1942) - Young Man (uncredited)
 Night in New Orleans (1942) - Newspaper Photographer (uncredited)
 American Empire (1942) - Crane
 O.S.S. (1946) - Partker
 Variety Girl (1947) - Soldier
 Out of the Past (1947) - Jim
 The Big Clock (1948) - Nat Sperling
 My Own True Love (1948) - Corporal
 Night Has a Thousand Eyes (1948) - Peter Vinson
 Isn't It Romantic? (1948) - Benjamin Logan
 Bride of Vengeance (1949) - Prisoner (uncredited)
 A Connecticut Yankee in King Arthur's Court (1949) - Sir Galahad
 Sands of Iwo Jima (1949) - Pfc. 'Handsome' Dan Shipley
 The Invisible Monster (1950, Serial) - Lane Carson
 I Was a Communist for the FBI (1951) - Ken Crowley
 Starlift (1951) - Col. Callan
 Distant Drums (1951) - Lt. Richard Tufts
 This Woman Is Dangerous (1952) - Franklin
 Mara Maru (1952) - Andy Callahan
 Carson City (1952) - Alan Kincaid
 The Nebraskan (1953) - Ace Elliott
 Jubilee Trail (1954) - Capt. Brown
 Prince Valiant (1954) - Sir Galahad (uncredited)
 The Black Dakotas (1954) - Frank Gibbs
 Three Hours to Kill (1954) - Carter Mastin
 A Star Is Born (1954) - Wallace (uncredited)
 Count Three and Pray (1955) - Big
 Artists and Models (1955) - Secret Service Agent Peters
 The Phantom Stagecoach (1957) - Tom Bradley
 Town Tamer (1965) - Kevin
 Git! (1965) - Andrew Garrett
 The Cat (1966) - Sheriff Vern
 Hillbillys in a Haunted House (1967) - Agent Jim Meadows
 The Gay Deceivers (1969) - Mr. Devlin
 Beware! The Blob (1972) - Sheriff Jones
 Never the Twain (1974) - Himself
 Mule Feathers (1977) - One-Eye (final film role)

References

External links

Richard Webb in Captain Midnight Information and memorabilia illustrations, on the Collecting Books and Magazines website

1915 births
1993 deaths
20th-century American male actors
20th-century American non-fiction writers
American male film actors
American male television actors
American writers on paranormal topics
Male actors from Illinois
People from Bloomington, Illinois
People from Van Nuys, Los Angeles
Suicides by firearm in California
1993 suicides